Ernst Krebs (4 November 1906 – 20 July 1970) was a German sprint canoeist, born in Munich. At the 1936 Summer Olympics, he won the gold medal in the K-1 10000 m event. This event took place on Friday 7 August 1936, at 5:10 pm. In total including himself, there were 15 participants representing 15 countries for the one-seater kayak race. Krebs won gold with a time of 46:01.6. The silver medal went to Fritz Landertinger, of Austria, with a time of 46.14.7 and the bronze medal went to Ernst Riedel, of the U.S.A., with a time of 47.23.9. The electric timing apparatus of the firm of Lòbner was used for time-keeping and there were four timekeepers at the finish line.

Prior to and during his canoeing career, he was a competitive cross-country skier and won four German titles with the Bavarian 4x10 km relay at the Nordic Championships from 1928-1932. At the 1929 FIS Nordic World Ski Championships, Krebs came eighth in an 18 km race. He was affiliated with the Kanu-Club der Turngemeinde München. In 1933, he won the European flatwater canoeing title in the K-1 over 10 km at the Canoe Sprint European Championships. He later qualified for the 1936 Olympics.

Krebs was also a mountaineer and would often go to the Alps with Toni Schmid (who had the second successful climb up the Matterhorn, alongside his brother Franz, in 1931). In 1932, Krebs survived a significant fall at the Großes Wiesbachhorn whilst climbing.

After his career in sports, he became a tinsmith. He died at age 63 in Gauting, Germany after an accident, where he fell off a ladder whilst installing a gutter to the third floor of a house.

References

Databaseolympics.com profile

1906 births
1970 deaths
Sportspeople from Munich
Canoeists at the 1936 Summer Olympics
German male canoeists
Olympic canoeists of Germany
Olympic gold medalists for Germany
Olympic medalists in canoeing
Medalists at the 1936 Summer Olympics